The 1982–83 season was Port Vale's 71st season of football in the English Football League, and their fifth successive season (11th overall) in the Fourth Division. John McGrath led the Vale to a club-record 88 points (equalled in 1993–94), which saw them win promotion in third place. This was some achievement considering McGrath had sold both the Chamberlain brothers and goalkeeper Mark Harrison to rivals Stoke City at the start of the season. Receiving £240,000 for these three players, he spent only £15,000 to bring top-scorer Bob Newton to Vale Park, and signed Player of the Year Wayne Cegielski for free.

Overview

Fourth Division
The pre-season saw John McGrath try, and fail, to re-sign the League of Ireland's player of the year, Felix Healy. He instead signed four players on free transfers: John Ridley (a former Valiant), Wayne Cegielski (Wrexham), Les Lawrence (Torquay United), and Steve Waddington (Walsall). The club also signed a shirt sponsorship deal with PMT. In August, rivals Stoke City paid Vale £180,000 for Mark Chamberlain and Mark Harrison. Chamberlain would go on to play for England. McGrath acted quickly to sign replacement keeper Barry Siddall from Sunderland, and take winger Kevin Sheldon on loan from Wigan Athletic.

The season started with five players making their débuts in a 1–0 defeat to Swindon Town at The County Ground. Waddington damaged his cartilages in this game. McGrath attempted to sign Norwich City's Mick Channon, but failed. Instead he took Bob Newton from Hartlepool United for £15,000. Stoke then took Neville Chamberlain to the Victoria Ground for £40,000. Vale's form did not suffer, and they instead won five straight games in October, taking them into third place. Also Chairman Don Ratcliffe was replaced by Jim Lloyd. Winger Steve Fox also arrived from Welsh club Wrexham on a free transfer. During the club's 2–1 win over Crewe Alexandra on 22 October at Gresty Road a petrol bomb was thrown at the 3,000 strong Vale crowd, though it was extinguished by police without doing 'any real damage'. On 6 November, Vale were losing 3–0 to Rochdale at Spotland and The Sentinel headlined their report with "Heavy defeat for Port Vale". This proved to be an inaccurate headline, as substitute Jimmy Greenhoff inspired a Vale fightback, and the match finished 3–3. In December, Colin Tartt was transfer listed following 'a bust-up with McGrath'. Following only one win in a run of five games, Tranmere Rovers' players told the Vale players "see you next season" after picking up a 1–0 win at Vale Park.

A win over Wimbledon started a run of ten wins in twelve games, despite having to sign Everton's Neville Southall on loan following a knee injury to Siddall. Their run put them nine points clear at the top of the table. At the end of February, Southall was recalled, and Stoke refused to loan back Harrison as cover. Wolverhampton Wanderers' Andy Poole proved to be an inadequate replacement. Vale then lost Greenhoff to Rochdale, who offered him the vacant management post. Lol Hamlett's last match as trainer (he retired due to illness) was a 2–0 defeat to Blackpool at Bloomfield Road, as Vale were in danger of failing to win promotion. McGrath decided to sign striker Jim Steel from Oldham Athletic for £10,000, and loaned Mark Lawrence from Hartlepool United. Siddall returned and so did Vale's form, as they recorded five victories in seven games. Ernie Moss left for Lincoln City for a £1,500 fee, McGrath saying 'age caught up with him'. Wimbledon ran away with the championship, though Vale managed to secure promotion with a 2–0 win over Stockport County at Edgeley Park on 6 May. The jubilant players seemed distracted in the final two games, and their two defeats allowed Hull City to take the runners-up spot.

They finished in third place with 88 points, seven points clear of fifth placed Bury. Conceding just 34 goals, theirs was the best defensive record in the top four divisions, along with Hull. Bob Newton was top-scorer with twenty goals, whilst four players were chosen for the PFA Fourth Division team – Phil Sproson, Russell Bromage, Geoff Hunter, and Steve Fox.

Finances
On the financial side, a record £100,888 profit was announced, their first profitable season since 1975–76. The lottery brought in £142,324, the open market rents took in £51,462, whilst Vale's average home attendance was the second highest in the division. Total liabilities stood at £236,850 and the bank overdraft was £128,123. Two players departing at the end of the season were Les Lawrence (Aldershot) and Steve Waddington (Chesterfield), who had not established themselves in the first team.

Cup competitions
In the FA Cup, they were knocked out by Third Division side Bradford City 1–0 in the First Round.

In the League Cup, Vale lost out 2–1 on aggregate to Rochdale, following a 2–0 defeat at Spotland.

League table

Results
Port Vale's score comes first

Football League Fourth Division

Results by matchday

Matches

FA Cup

League Cup

Player statistics

Appearances

Top scorers

Transfers

Transfers in

Transfers out

Loans in

References
Specific

General

Port Vale F.C. seasons
Port Vale